Euan Sutherland is a Scottish businessman who was the Chief Executive of SuperGroup plc which owns the Superdry chain of clothing shops. On 11 December 2019 it was announced he will take over as CEO of the over-50s insurance company, Saga. He took up his role on 6 January 2020.

Career
After training in marketing with Coca-Cola, he worked in marketing a retail management positions with Mars Confectionery, Matalan, Currys and Superdrug. He then joined Kingfisher plc, rising to the position of chief operating officer.

Co-operative Group
Touted as a replacement for Kingfisher CEO Ian Cheshire, he joined the Co-operative Group in April 2013, taking over from Peter Marks as chief executive.

Due to inadequate capital levels in its banking group, Moody's downgraded the bank's credit rating by six notches to junk status (Ba3) and the bank's chief executive Barry Tootell resigned. The difficulties stemmed largely from the commercial loans of the Britannia Building Society, acquired in the 2009 merger.

Sutherland restructured, by intending to sell the life insurance business to Royal London releasing about £200m in capital, and planning to dispose of its other insurance business. On 5 June Richard Pennycook, former finance director of Morrisons, was named Co-operative Group's finance director, and Richard Pym, former chief executive of the Alliance & Leicester bank, as chair of the Co-operative Banking Group and the Co-operative Bank.

In March 2014, Sutherland resigned from The Co-operative because he said "I now feel that until the Group adopts professional and commercial governance it will be impossible to implement what my team and I believe are the necessary changes and reforms to renew the Group and give it a relevant and sustainable future". He was replaced by Richard Pennycook, then chief financial officer, who became the group's interim Chief Executive.

Supergroup
On 22 October 2014, it was announced that Sutherland was CEO of SuperGroup plc.

On 2 April 2019, Sutherland resigned as CEO of SuperGroup plc after founder Julian Dunkerton won a bid to be reinstated to the SuperGroup plc board.

Saga 
In December 2019, Saga employs Euan Sutherland, longtime leader of Superdry and Co-op, as chief executive. At a crucial moment he joined with Saga. The insurance firm, which accounts for the overwhelming majority of the group 's earnings, has needed to dramatically slash premiums to stay profitable. Whereas the travel company is preparing to introduce two freshly built cruise ships.

Personal life
Sutherland is married with three sons. His interests include Rugby Union and Formula One.

References 

Date of birth missing (living people)
Living people
Scottish businesspeople
1969 births